Mitnick, Mitnik, Mytnik, or Mytnyk is a surname of Slavic-language origin, signifying a toll collector. Mytnik is the Polish, Belarusian, and Russian form. Its Ukrainian version is Mytnyk. The surname may refer to:
 Kevin Mitnick (born 1963), American computer security consultant, author and hacker
Tadeusz Mytnik (born 1949), Polish cyclist.
Vadzim Mytnik (born 1988), Belarusian association football player

References

Belarusian-language surnames
Polish-language surnames
Ukrainian-language surnames